This list of St. Olaf Alumni contains links to Wikipedia articles about notable alumni and other people connected to St. Olaf College, a private liberal arts college in Northfield, Minnesota.

Notable alumni

Composers and conductors
Kenneth Jennings, class of 1950
Dale Warland, class of 1954
David Boe, class of 1958
René Clausen, class of 1974
Anton Armstrong, class of 1978
Timothy Mahr, class of 1978
Bradley Ellingboe, class of 1980
Craig Hella Johnson, class of 1984
Jocelyn Hagen, class of 2003

Politicians, Statesmen and Judges
Russell A. Anderson, class of 1964, Chief Justice of the Minnesota Supreme Court
August H. Andresen, class of 1912
Arnie Arnesen, class of 1975, fellow of Harvard Institute of Politics and member of New Hampshire House of Representatives
David Bly, class of 1974?, member of the Minnesota House of Representatives
Satveer Chaudhary, class of 1991, former member of the Minnesota State legislature
Raymond Cox, class of 1974, former member of the Minnesota House of Representatives 
Kim Elton, class of 1968, former member of the Alaska Senate
Arlen Erdahl, class of 1953, United States Representative from Minnesota
Joan Ericksen, class of 1977, Judge of the United States District Court for the District of Minnesota
Tom Fiebiger, class of 1978, member of the North Dakota Senate
Mary Forsythe, class of 1922, member of Minnesota House of Representatives
Ian C. Kelly, class of 1977
David L. Knutson, class of 1982, Minnesota State Senator of District 37, 2003-2004
John Marty, class of 1978
David Minge, class of 1963
Erik Paulsen, class of 1987, United States Representative from Minnesota
Al Quie, class of 1950
Karl F. Rolvaag, class of 1941
Steve Sviggum, class of 1979
Eric C. Tostrud, class of 1987, Judge of the United States District Court for the District of Minnesota
Andrew Volstead, class of 1881, US house of representatives for Minnesota, introduced National Prohibition Act

Writers
Robert Bly, class of 1950 (transferred out), leader of the Mythopoetic men's movement
Kristina Halvorson, class of 1993
Michelle Hoover, class of 1994
Siri Hustvedt, class of 1977
Kij Johnson, class of 1982
Peg Kerr, class of 1982
Sarah Lindsay, class of 1980
Timothy Mason, class of 1972, playwright
Emily Rapp, class of 1996
Mark Rein•Hagen, author of Vampire: The Masquerade class of 1988
Ole Rolvaag, class of 1905, author of Giants in the Earth

Religion
Johan Arnd Aasgaard, class of 1898, American Lutheran church leader
James Reeb, class of 1950, minister, pastor, and Civil Rights activist, 1927-1965
Stuart E. Barstad, class of 1951?, Chief of Chaplains of the United States Air Force from 1985 to 1988
David Ede, class of 1957, American scholar of Islam
Alan M. Olson, class of 1961, philosopher, Boston University, 1974-2013

Other
Edward Sövik, class of 1939, architect and later St. Olaf faculty member
Roger Grimsby, class of 1950, television news anchor
Willis H. Flygare, class of 1958, chemist credited with "outstanding contributions to the understanding of molecular electronic structure"
John Enemark, class of 1962, American biochemist
Barry Morrow, class of 1970, Oscar-winning screenwriter
Gretchen Morgenson, class of 1976, Pulitzer Prize-winning journalist
Joan N. Ericksen, class of 1977, judge of the United States District Court for the District of Minnesota
Cheryl Willman, class of 1977, cancer researcher and executive director of Mayo Clinic Cancer Programs
David L. Rose, class of 1989, tech entrepreneur and inventor
Margaret Sordahl, ornithologist
Ward Sutton, class of 1989, cartoonist and illustrator, 2018 Herblock Award winner
Dean Buntrock, founder and former chairman and CEO of Waste Management, Inc. and largest school benefactor
Jason DeRose, class of 1997, Western Bureau Chief for National Public Radio News
Amanda Cox, class of 2001, Editor of The Upshot section of the New York Times

Notable faculty
Anton Armstrong, conductor of the St. Olaf Choir
Kenneth O. Bjork, historian and educator
F. Melius Christiansen, founder of the St. Olaf Choir
John Ferguson, organist and composer
Kenneth Jennings, composer and former conductor of the St. Olaf Choir
Robert Jenson, theologian
Chris Meidt, head football coach (2002–2007), assistant coach with Washington Redskins
Anantanand Rambachan, Hindu scholar
Ole Rolvaag, author
Edward Sövik, class of 1939, architect and later St. Olaf faculty member
Lynn Steen, mathematician
Charles Taliaferro, philosopher

References

St. Olaf College people
St. Olaf College people